Richard Rivalee, is a Malaysian fashion designer based in Penang, Malaysia.

Early life
He was born in 1966 from mixed Thai and Chinese parentage. He was brought up by his father in Penang, Malaysia after his parents’ divorce and due to family financial condition, he dropped out of school at very young age. He started his career as a hair stylist with a strong passion in fashion design. After years of savings, he enrolled for fashion design classes and apprenticed with Mdm.P’ng Guay Keow of Galeen Fashion Institute. With his talent, passion and creativity, Richard quickly gained recognitions in the industry via winning several state and national level fashion design awards such as Penang Young Designer High Fashion Award 1993/94 and MODA Theater Clothes of High Fashion 1997/98.

Fashion Style
Richard is best known for his design in High Fashion under the label of Richard Rivalee Couture House. Recent notable collections include well-known evening gown series which featured in his "Richard Rivalee's Black Collection 2011". The uniqueness of his collections is that each masterpiece that sold to its clients will never repeat again. His womenswear collections cover western style and Malay style evening gowns and bridal gowns. His menswear collections cover modern classic clothing, suits and tuxedos.

Fashion Business
Richard's designs and collections have reached internationally with clienteles from Asia, Europe and United States of America with patronage from royal families, celebrities and the rich & famous. His collections are often featured in renowned fashion and life style magazines in Malaysia and international such as Essenze (Malaysia), Backstage Professional (Malaysia), Fiori (Indonesia), AXM (UK) and many more.  His collections are no stranger to fashion weeks, charity fashion events, ballroom galas and international beauty pageants. Among the projects, he has worked with international celebrities such as Petrina Fung Bo Bo, Amber Chia, Ning Baizura and Soong Ai Ling. His collections also featured in international renowned brands events such as Poh Kong Jeweller, Cartier, Swarovski and Jaeger-LeCoultre.

Business Acquisition
In early 2012, the label was acquired by a group of private investors for an undisclosed amount. Richard Rivalee is named the Chief Designer of the Company. On 19 May 2012, the Label celebrated its 22nd Anniversary in conjunction with the launch of its new label design. The event was held at the main premise located at the UNESCO World Heritage Site - Georgetown, Penang, Malaysia. According to its internal source, the company direction is to rebrand the label to international level while maintaining its uniqueness. In May 2012, Richard Rivalee was featured on Hong Kong TVBE channel via the introduction by Petrina Fung Bo Bo as her personal fashion designer.

Major Events/Sponsorships

Richard also make appearance as guest judge on various model contests, talent shows and beauty pageants.

Major Events/Sponsorships by Richard Rivalee Couture House:

 Miss Malaysia Universe Grand Final - 2002
 Kuala Lumpur Fashion Week & Simply Haute Fashion Gala Dinner - 2004
 Richard Rivalee Fashion Collection - 2005
 Cartier Jewelry Fashion Show - 2006
 Swarovski Creature Design Fashion Show - 2007
 Ning Baizura Batique Evening - 2008
 Jaeger-LeCoultre Watches Show, Mystical Adventure - 2009
 Poh Kong Jewelry Collections Fashion Show - 2012
 In-Penang Award Presentation - 2012
 Miss Auto City Beauty Pageant - 2012
 Hong Kong aTV 55th Anniversary Show at Beijing - 2012

References

1966 births
Living people
People from Penang
Malaysian fashion designers
Malaysian businesspeople
Malaysian people of Thai descent
Malaysian people of Chinese descent